The Virée de Galerne was a military operation of the War in the Vendée during the French Revolutionary Wars across Brittany and Normandy. It takes its name from French virée (turn) and Breton gwalarn (northwest wind).

It concerns the Vendean army's crossing of the river Loire after their defeat in the Battle of Cholet on 17 October 1793 and its march to Granville in the hope of finding reinforcements there from England. Unable to take Granville on 14 November 1793, it fell back towards Savenay (23 December 1793) where it was completely destroyed by Republican troops under Kléber. The battle of Savenay marked the end of what would come to be called the First War in the Vendée.

Course

Rout at Cholet

On 17 October 1793, the Republican Army of the West coordinated an attack on the Vendéen Royalists and squeezed them into a pocket at Cholet. Encircled, the Catholic and Royal Armies of Anjou and Haut-Poitou desperately attempted to resist but were decisively beaten. In the battle, Charles de Bonchamps was mortally wounded and 8,000 Vendéen Royalists were estimated to be killed, wounded or missing in action. With no choice, the Vendéen forces chose to take the only escape route open and fall back first to Beaupréau to the northwest then later to Saint-Florent-le-Vieil, where they were cornered in a bend of the river Loire.

The Republicans' situation

Vendéen victories

After occupying Varades, the Vendéen general staff decided to march on Laval, in the former lands of the Prince of Talmont. The latter was convinced that his influence would provoke an insurrection in the country. On 20 October, the Vendeans reached Candé, then Château-Gontier on the 21st, meeting little resistance. On 22 October, they seized Laval after a short battle. The generals then decided to give their men a few days' rest. However, on the same day, the Republican forces of the Army of the West crossed the Loire at Angers and Nantes, determined to pursue the "Brigands". Only Nicolas Haxo remained in the Vendée with his division, in order to fight Charette's troops. On 25 October, the Republican vanguard, 4,000 men strong, commanded by Westermann and Beaupuy, entered Château-Gontier. The republicans were exhausted, but Westermann refused to wait for the bulk of the army and, the very next day, he launched an attack on Laval. It was a rout for the Republican forces who lost 1,600 men at Croix-Bataille.

The next day, Westermann was joined at Villiers-Charlemagne by the rest of the army, commanded by Jean Léchelle. He immediately decided to launch a new attack. Despite the opposition of Kléber, who wanted to rest the troops, the Republicans attacked Laval again on 26 October. The stupidity of Léchelle's plan caused a new rout in the vicinity of Entrammes, and the Republicans had to flee to Lion-d'Angers. In the pursuit, the Vendeans even retook Château-Gontier where General Beaupuy was seriously wounded. The Republicans had 4,000 killed and wounded out of 20,000 men; the Vendeans had only 400 dead and 1,200 wounded out of 25,000 men.

A few days later, Léchelle was arrested on the orders of Merlin de Thionville and sent to Nantes, where he committed suicide on 11 November. The day after the battle, as the Vendéens returned to Laval, Kléber decided to return to Angers with the army in order to reorganize his forces. The representatives appointed Alexis Chalbos as acting general-in-chief.

The Chouans

The march on Granville

Battle of Dol

Retreat to the Loire

Rout at Le Mans

Destruction of the Catholic and Royal Army

Repression and reprisals

Timeline

 18 October: The Vendéens cross the Loire at Saint-Florent-le-Vieil.
 19 October: La Rochejaquelein elected generalissimo.
 23 October: The Vendéens and Chouans take Laval, its 15,000 defenders beaten into retreat almost without a battle.
 27 October: Battle of Entrames, Republicans crushed, Léchelle removed.
 2 November: Capture of Mayenne.
 3–4 November: Battle of Fougères.
 4 November: Death of general Lescure.
 9 November: The Vendéens are at Dol-de-Bretagne.
 11 November: They are at Pontorson.
 12 November: They reach Avranches.
 14–15 November: Siege of Granville, Vendéens checked and about-turn.
 16 November: Retreat to Avranches
 18 November: Battle of Pontorson.
 20–22 November: Battle of Dol.
 23–24 November: The Vendéens take Fougères without a fight.
 25 November: They retake Laval without a fight.
 30 November: Battle of La Flèche.
 3 December: Siege of Angers, Vendéens checked.
 5 December: The Vendéens are at Baugé.
 7 December: Retreat to La Flèche.
 10–13 December: Battle of Le Mans
 14 December: The Vendéens again return to Laval
 16 December: They are at Ancenis; La Rochejaquelein, Jean-Nicolas Stofflet and 4,000 soldiers manage to cross the Loire.
 17 December: Republican ships cut off the passage.
 20 December: The Vendéens are at Blain.
 23 December: Battle of Savenay, annihilation of the Vendéen army.

References

Bibliography
 Brochet, Louis. "History of Vendée, Lower Poitou in France." Historie de Vendee.com, SEV, www.histoiredevendee.com/index.htm.								
 Gabory, Emile. Les guerres de Vendée, Robert Laffont, 1989.
 Martin, Jean-Clément. Blancs et Bleus dans la Vendée déchirée, collection "Découvertes Gallimard" (nº 8), 1986.
 Secher, Reynald and René Le Honzec. Vendée, 1789–1801, cartoon, éditions Reynald Secher.
 Smith, Digby. The Napoleonic Wars Data Book, Greenhill Books, 1989, .

External links
 History of the Vendée

War in the Vendée
Conflicts in 1793